Svend Hansen (5 December 1905 – 25 January 1976) was a Danish footballer. He played in one match for the Denmark national football team in 1931.

References

External links
 

1905 births
1976 deaths
Danish men's footballers
Denmark international footballers
Place of birth missing
Association footballers not categorized by position